Llapingachos are fried potato pancakes that originated in Ecuador. They are usually served with salsa de maní, a peanut sauce. The potato patties or thick pancakes are stuffed with cheese and cooked on a hot griddle until crispy brown.

In Ecuador they are sometimes made with mashed, cooked yuca, or cassava, instead of potato.  The yuca or cassava root used to make llapingachos is not to be confused with the similarly spelled yucca, the roots of which are generally not edible.

Ecuador
Llapingachos originated in Ambato, Ecuador. It is fried mashed potato surrounding a center of cheese which is generally served with baked or fried pork. It is typically served with avocado, sausage, fried egg, tomato and lettuce salad on the side. This dish forms part of Ecuador's culture, and is one of the representative icons of Highland food. Llapingachos are popular not only in Ecuador's Highlands but also in the coast and eastern provinces.

See also
 List of Ecuadorian dishes and foods
 List of stuffed dishes

References

External links 
 Cocina del mundo

Cheese dishes
Ecuadorian cuisine
Potato pancakes
Stuffed dishes